The Wanderings of Oisin and Other Poems was the first collection of poems by W. B. Yeats. It was published in 1889.

In addition to the title poem, the last epic-scale poem that Yeats ever wrote, the book includes a number of short poems that Yeats would later collect under the title Crossways in his Collected Poems.

Contents
The Wanderings of Oisin
The Song of the Happy Shepherd
The Sad Shepherd
The Cloak, the Boat, and the Shoes
Anashuya and Vijaya
The Indian upon God
The Indian to His Love
The Falling of the Leaves
Ephemera
The Madness of King Goll
The Stolen Child
To an Isle in the Water
Down by the Salley Gardens
The Meditation of the Old Fisherman
The Ballad of Father O'Hart
The Ballad of Moll Magee
The Ballad of the Foxhunter

See also
List of works by William Butler Yeats

Notes

References

1889 books
Irish poetry collections
Poetry by W. B. Yeats